The 2020 Ontario Tankard, the provincial men's curling championship for Southern Ontario, was held from January 28 to February 2 at the Ed Lumley Arena in Cornwall, Ontario. The winning John Epping rink will represent Ontario at the 2020 Tim Hortons Brier in Kingston, Ontario. The event was held in conjunction with the 2020 Ontario Scotties Tournament of Hearts, the women's provincial championship.

John Epping won his second Ontario Tankard by defeating Glenn Howard 8–3 in the final.

Qualification process
Nine teams will qualify from two cash spiels (two each), an open qualifier (two teams), plus the top two southern Ontario teams in the CTRS standings (as of December 1, 2019). Originally the event was to have just eight teams, but CurlON decided on December 9, 2019 to expand the field to nine teams with the addition of one team qualifying through their CTRS ranking. This is a reduction from the ten teams which played in the 2019 Tankard, making the number of entries equal to the provincial Scotties.

Teams

The team lineups are as follows:

Round-robin standings
Final round-robin standings

Round-robin results
All draws are listed in Eastern Time (UTC−05:00).

Draw 1
Monday, January 27, 8:00 pm

Draw 2
Tuesday, January 28, 12:15 pm

Draw 3
Tuesday, January 28, 8:00 pm

Draw 4
Wednesday, January 29, 8:30 am

Draw 5
Wednesday, January 29, 4:00 pm

Draw 6
Thursday, January 30, 12:15 pm

Draw 7
Thursday, January 30, 7:45 pm

Draw 8
Friday, January 31, 12:15 pm

Draw 9
Friday, January 31, 7:45 pm

Tiebreaker
Saturday, February 1, 8:00 am

Playoffs

Semifinal
Saturday, February 1, 4:30 pm

Final
Sunday, February 2, 1:00 pm

Qualification

Cash Spiel #1
December 20–22, Guelph Curling Club, Guelph

Cash Spiel #2
January 10-12, 2020, Quinte Curling Club, Belleville

Open qualifier
January 17–19, 2020, KW Granite Club, Waterloo

References

External link
Official site

Ontario
Sport in Cornwall, Ontario
Ontario Tankard
Ontario Scotties Tournament of Hearts
Ontario Tankard
Ontario Tankard